Berzercon ferdinandi is a species of mite. It is the only species of the monotypic genus Berzercon (Seeman & Baker, 2013).

Distribution 
The species is found in the North Island of New Zealand, on large carabid beetles.

References 

Acari of New Zealand
Animals described in 2013
Terrestrial biota of New Zealand
Monotypic arachnid genera